= Rally for France (Niger) =

Political party in Niger

The Rally for France (French: Rassemblement pour la France, RPF) was a political party in Niger.

== History ==
Founded by French residents in the territory, the party's Jean Audu, won one of the three seats allotted to Niger in the October 10, 1953 elections to the Assembly of the French Union.
